Poitevin-Saintongeais (autonym: poetevin-séntunjhaes; also called Parlanjhe, Aguiain or even Aguiainais in French) is a langue d'oïl language spoken in the regions of the Pays de la Loire and Nouvelle-Aquitaine, officially recognised by the French Ministry of Culture as a language with two dialects, Poitevin and Saintongeais. This classification is a subgroup of the Romance, and the Gallo-Romance languages.

Some of their descendants would become the Acadian people of Atlantic Canada as well as the Cajun people of Louisiana.

The dialects of this language are peculiar to the historical regions and provinces of Poitou and Saintonge. It is classified as severely endangered by UNESCO.

References

External links
DGLFLF - Ministry of Culture 
Association for the Parlanjhe
Xaintonge association-edition

Oïl languages
Languages of France
Endangered Romance languages